Double Jay (1944–1972) was an American Thoroughbred racehorse. Bred by John W. Stanley in Lexington, Kentucky, he was purchased as a yearling for $19,000 by Wilmington, Delaware businessmen James V. Tigani and James Boines who raced them under their newly formed partnership, Ridgewood Stable.

Trained by Walter "Duke" McCue, as a two-year-old, Double Jay won six of ten starts. He won two stakes races at Narragansett Park. DJ capped off his campaign with a win in the  Garden State Stakes on October 19, 1946 and a year topper in the Kentucky Jockey Club Stakes at Churchill Downs on November 2.  His performances that year earned him American Champion Two-Year-Old Colt honors.

Racing at age three, Double Jay was one of the early favorites for the Kentucky Derby, the first leg of the U.S. Triple Crown series. However, he finished third in an allowance race in April at Churchill Downs and then was fifth in a six-horse field in the Derby Trial Stakes behind winner, Faultless  and as a result, was sent off as a long-shot in the Derby. After finishing a distant twelfth in the Derby's thirteen-horse field he did not run in the Preakness and Belmont Stakes. While he went on to win the important Jersey Handicap,  he did not achieve the same level of success at three as he had at two.

Racing at age four and five, Double Jay's most important win came in California in the 1949 American Handicap in which he equaled the track record of 1:48.60 for 1⅛ miles in the year when the race was run at Santa Anita Park.

A Champion broodmare sire
The sire of several good runners, Double Jay produced progeny that included:
 Manotick (b. 1952) - won Ladies Handicap, Gazelle Stakes, Molly Pitcher Handicap
 Bagdad (b. 1956) - wins included the San Antonio Handicap and Hollywood Derby
 Irish Jay (b. 1957) - filly whose wins include the Spinaway Stakes, Demoiselle Stakes, Acorn Stakes, Comely Stakes 
 Sunrise Flight (b. 1959) - multiple stakes winner, damsire of Kentucky Derby and Preakness Stakes winner, Pleasant Colony

Double Jay was  the North American Champion broodmare sire in 1971, 1975, 1977, and 1981 and was second in three other years: 1972, 1976, 1980. Of his daughter's successful progeny, Double Jay is best remembered as the damsire of:
 Old Hat (b. 1959) - two-time American Champion Older Female Horse; 
 Nodouble (b. 1965) - American Champion Older Male Horse and 1981 Leading sire in North America;
John Henry (b. 1975) - two-time American Horse of the Year and U.S. Racing Hall of Fame inductee; 
 Ferdinand (b. 1983) - won Kentucky Derby, Breeders' Cup Classic.

Double Jay died in 1972 and is buried in the equine cemetery at Claiborne Farm near Paris, Kentucky.

Pedigree

References
 Double Jay's pedigree and partial racing stats

1944 racehorse births
1972 racehorse deaths
Racehorses bred in Kentucky
Racehorses trained in the United States
American Champion racehorses
United States Champion Thoroughbred Sires
American Champion Thoroughbred broodmare sires
Thoroughbred family 14-a
Chefs-de-Race